The Louisville Rebels were a minor league professional ice hockey team that played in the International Hockey League from 1957 to 1960. The Rebels were based in Louisville, Kentucky and originally played at the Louisville Gardens, and later the Freedom Hall. The team was previously known as the Huntington Hornets in 1956–57, and had relocated from Huntington, West Virginia.

In their first season, the Rebels placed third in the regular season, and defeated the first place Cincinnati Mohawks in the first round of the playoffs three games to two. The Mohawks were the defending champions, and had won the league playoffs the last five consecutive seasons. The Rebels moved on to the finals, a series they led versus the Indianapolis Chiefs three games to two, but eventually lost in seven games. In 1958–59, the Rebels finished first in the regular season, winning the Fred A. Huber Trophy, and won their first Turner Cup, defeating the Fort Wayne Komets in six games in the championship finals.

Louisville finished second in the east division during the 1959–60 season, but were eliminated in the first round of the playoffs. The Rebels disbanded after the season.

Season-by-season results

See also
 Sports in Louisville, Kentucky

References

External links
 Louisville Rebels history
 Louisville Rebels statistics

 
International Hockey League (1945–2001) teams
Defunct ice hockey teams in the United States
Ice hockey clubs established in 1957
Ice hockey clubs disestablished in 1960
1957 establishments in Kentucky
1960 disestablishments in Kentucky
Ice hockey teams in Kentucky